The Pakistan women's cricket team played Sri Lanka women's cricket team in March 2018. The tour consisted of three Women's One Day Internationals (WODIs) and three Women's Twenty20 Internationals (WT20Is). The WODI games were part of the 2017–20 ICC Women's Championship. Ahead of the series, the Pakistan Cricket Board (PCB) selected twenty-one players to take part in a training camp in Lahore. Pakistan Women won the WODI series 3–0 and the WT20I series 2–1.

Squads

WODI series

1st WODI

2nd WODI

3rd WODI

WT20I series

1st WT20I

2nd WT20I

3rd WT20I

References

External links
 Series home at ESPN Cricinfo

Women's international cricket tours of Sri Lanka
2017–20 ICC Women's Championship
2018 in Sri Lankan cricket
2018 in Pakistani cricket
International cricket competitions in 2017–18
Sri 2018 
2018 in women's cricket
2018 in Pakistani women's sport